The ROH Hall of Fame is a hall of fame that honors professional wrestlers and wrestling personalities who contributed to the history of the U.S. based wrestling promotion Ring of Honor.

History
ROH established its hall of fame on January 26, 2022, as part of the celebration of the promotion's 20th anniversary. They announced that four inductees will make up the inaugural class. The ceremony was presented March 5, 2022, on ROH TV.

Inductees

Individuals

Group inductions

Legacy Award

References

External links
 Official site

2022 establishments in the United States
Awards established in 2022
Hall of Fameta
Professional wrestling-related lists
Professional wrestling halls of fame